is a railway station on the "Hanasaki Line" section of the JR Hokkaido Nemuro Main Line. Located in Akkeshi, Hokkaidō, Japan, the station opened on December 1, 1917.

References

Railway stations in Hokkaido Prefecture
Stations of Hokkaido Railway Company
Akkeshi, Hokkaido
Railway stations in Japan opened in 1917